Pediacus fuscus is a species of flat bark beetle in the family Cucujidae. It is found in Europe and Northern Asia (excluding China) and North America.

References

Further reading

 
 
 

Cucujidae